Shazam Babwah (born 7 July 1977) is a Trinidadian cricketer. He played in twelve first-class, twelve List A, and five Twenty20 matches for Trinidad and Tobago from 2002 to 2006.

See also
 List of Trinidadian representative cricketers

References

External links
 

1977 births
Living people
Trinidad and Tobago cricketers